The Prince Hall Masonic Temple is a historic building located at 1335 North Boulevard in Baton Rouge, Louisiana.

Originally designed in 1924 as a meeting hall for the Grand United Order of Odd Fellows, the building housed the Temple Theatre and the Temple Roof Garden, which represented two major point of entertainment for African-American citizens of Baton Rouge. The Temple Theatre is the last remaining of the three city theatres for the large black population, the other two (the Grand Theatre and the McKinley Theatre) are no more in existence. The Temple Roof Garden was particularly popular amongst youth clubs for the dances held until the late 1930s and 1940s.

The building was purchased by the Prince Hall Freemasons in 1948. It was listed on the National Register of Historic Places in 1994.

It was added to the National Register of Historic Places on June 02, 1994.

See also
National Register of Historic Places listings in East Baton Rouge Parish, Louisiana

References

External links
 Images at waymarking.com

Buildings and structures in Baton Rouge, Louisiana
Masonic buildings in Louisiana
Clubhouses on the National Register of Historic Places in Louisiana
National Register of Historic Places in Baton Rouge, Louisiana